Uninet may refer to different institutions, such as:

Thailand Education and Research Network - UniNet
Uninet - Uninet was the initial brand used by Telmex, a Mexican telecommunications company